Marymount High School is an independent, Catholic, all-girls, college-preparatory high school located in the Bel Air neighborhood of Los Angeles, California. It sits on Sunset Boulevard across from the University of California, Los Angeles campus at 10643 Sunset Boulevard. The school's main administration building, chapel and auditorium are listed as Los Angeles Historic-Cultural Monuments.

Marymount was established in 1923 by the Religious of the Sacred Heart of Mary. Mother Marie Joseph Butler of the Religious of the Sacred Heart of Mary founded the school. Marymount students and teams are known as the "Sailors".

Marymount High School is one of nineteen members of the Global Network of RSHM Schools worldwide.
Marymount's classes have a 8:1 Student-Teacher ratio with the average class size of 14.

Notable alumnae 
 Tatyana Ali, class of 1997, actress.
 Giada De Laurentiis, class of 1989, chef on the Food Network
 Mia Farrow, class of 1963
 Olivia Jade Giannulli, class of 2018, YouTuber, subject of the 2019 college admissions scandal.
 Mariska Hargitay, class of 1982, actress
 Khloe Kardashian, class of 2003, television and internet personality
 Kim Kardashian, class of 1998, television personality
 Kourtney Kardashian, class of 1997, television personality
 Marlo Thomas, class of 1955, actress, producer, author, and social activist
 Cammie King, class of 1952, child actress and public relations officer
 Bianca Lawson, class of 1997, actress
 Nika Soon-Shiong, class of 2011, activist

References

External links 

 Marymount High School website

Girls' schools in California
Roman Catholic secondary schools in Los Angeles County, California
Educational institutions established in 1923
High schools in Los Angeles
Bel Air, Los Angeles
Catholic secondary schools in California
1923 establishments in California